Memoir of Halldór Laxness was published in Iceland from 2003. It is the memoir of novelist and Nobel Laureate, Halldór Laxness and is in three volumes:

 Halldór the first part was published in 2003
 Part two Kiljan was published in 2004
 Part three, Laxness, remains to be published.

Part I, Halldór
This volume is 620 pages long, including references and index. The book was published by Almenna bókafélagið and is in Icelandic.

It covers the years 1902 to 1932; his first years as a child, his years in Menntaskólinn í Reykjavík, his first dictations from his works, his first travels to foreign countries and adventures there, his stay in the abbey, his relationships with other authors, his first four books and his stay in America.

Part II, Kiljan
This part was published in 2004.

Part III, Laxness
To be published.

References

2003 non-fiction books
Icelandic books